Abdirizak Bihi is a Somali-American social activist. Since 1996, he has been an organizer within the Somali community in Minneapolis, Minnesota. Bihi is the Director of the Somali Education and Social Advocacy Center. In this capacity, he has worked toward educating and training Somali leaders for civic action.

References

Living people
Ethnic Somali people
Somalian activists
Somalian emigrants to the United States
Year of birth missing (living people)